Agrilus integerrimus is a species of beetles belonging to the family Buprestidae. It is present in most of Europe.

External links
 Biolib
 Fauna Europaea

integerrimus
Beetles of Europe
Taxa named by Julius Theodor Christian Ratzeburg
Beetles described in 1837